The National Workers' Union (NWU) is a trade union in Guyana. It is affiliated with the International Trade Union Confederation.

References
 

Trade unions in Guyana
International Trade Union Confederation